Piper is a given name meaning “piper”. The name has increased in popularity in recent years due to a character on the television series Charmed.

The following people are referred to as “Piper”:

 Piper Campbell (born 1965), American diplomat
 Piper Curda (born 1997), American actress and singer
 Piper Davis (1917–1997), American Negro league baseball player
 Piper Dellums, American author and public speaker
 Piper Gilles (born 1992), American-Canadian ice dancer
 Piper Harris (born 2000), American child actress
 Piper Kerman (born 1969), American memoirist and convicted money launderer and drug trafficker, author of Orange Is the New Black: My Year in a Women's Prison
 Piper Laurie (born 1932), American actress
 Piper Madison (born 2002), American singer
 Piper Perabo (born 1976), American actress
 Piper Reese (born 2000), American child reporter and actress

Fictional Characters
 Piper Chapman, protagonist of the series Orange Is the New Black and based on Piper Kerman
 Piper McLean, fictional demigod daughter of Aphrodite created by Rick Riordan
 Piper Halliwell, fictional character in the WB series Charmed

See also
 Pyper

References

English given names
Unisex given names